Lake Okeechobee, also known as Florida's Inland Sea, is the largest freshwater lake in the U.S. state of Florida. It is the tenth largest natural freshwater lake among the 50 states of the United States and the second-largest natural freshwater lake contained entirely within the contiguous 48 states, after Lake Michigan.

It is not only the largest lake in Florida or the largest lake in the southeast United States, but it is too large to see across, giving it the feel of an ocean. The Kissimmee River, located directly north of Lake Okeechobee, is the lake's primary source. The lake is divided between Glades, Okeechobee, Martin, Palm Beach and Hendry counties. All five counties meet at one point near the center of the lake.

History
The earliest recorded people to have lived around the lake were the Calusa. They called the lake Mayaimi, meaning "big water," as reported in the 16th century, by Hernando de Escalante Fontaneda. The name Okeechobee comes from the Hitchiti words oki (water) and chubi (big). Slightly later in the 16th century, René Goulaine de Laudonnière reported hearing about a large freshwater lake in southern Florida called Serrope. By the 18th century the largely mythical lake was known to British mapmakers and chroniclers by the Spanish name Laguna de Espiritu Santo. In the early 19th century it was known as Mayacco Lake or Lake Mayaca after the Mayaca people, originally from the upper reaches of the St. Johns River, who moved near the lake in the early 18th century. The modern Port Mayaca on the east side of the lake preserves that name.

On the southern rim of Lake Okeechobee, three islands—Kreamer, Ritta, and Torey—were once settled by early pioneers. These settlements had a general store, post office, school, and town elections. Farming was the main vocation. The fertile land was challenging to farm because of the muddy muck. Over the first half of the twentieth century, farmers used agricultural tools—including tractors—to farm in the muck. By the 1960s, all of these settlements were abandoned.

All of Lake Okeechobee was included in the boundaries of Palm Beach County when it was created in 1909. In 1963, the lake was divided among the five counties surrounding the lake.

Hurricanes
In 1926, the Great Miami Hurricane hit the Lake Okeechobee area, killing approximately 300 people. Two years later in 1928, the Okeechobee Hurricane crossed over the lake, killing thousands. The Red Cross reported 1,836 deaths, a figure which the National Weather Service initially accepted, but in 2003, the number was revised to "at least 2,500". In both cases the catastrophe was caused by flooding from a storm surge when strong winds drove water over the  mud dike that circled the lake at the time. After the two hurricanes, the Florida State Legislature created the "Okeechobee Flood Control District". 

The organization was authorized to cooperate with the U.S. Army Corps of Engineers in actions to prevent similar disasters. U.S. President Herbert Hoover visited the area personally, and afterward the Corps designed a plan incorporating the construction of channels, gates, and nearly 140 miles of levees to protect areas surrounding Lake Okeechobee from overflow. 

The Okeechobee Waterway was officially opened on March 23, 1937, by a procession of boats which left Fort Myers, Florida on March 22 and arrived at Stuart, Florida the following day. The dike was then named the "Herbert Hoover Dike" in honor of the president.

The 1947 Fort Lauderdale Hurricane sent an even larger storm surge to the crest of the new dike, which was expanded again in the 1960s.

Four recent hurricanes – Frances, Jeanne, Wilma, and Irma – had no major adverse effects on communities surrounding Lake Okeechobee, even though the lake rose  after Hurricane Wilma in 2005.

Rim Canal

During construction of the dike, earth was excavated along the inside perimeter, resulting in a deep channel which runs along the perimeter of the lake. This channel is known as the rim canal. In most places the canal is part of the lake, but in others it is separated from the open lake by low grassy islands such as Kreamer Island. During the drought of 2007–2008, this canal remained navigable while much of surrounding areas were too shallow or even above the water line. Even when the waters are higher, navigating the open lake can be difficult, whereas the rim canal is easier, so to reach a specific location in the lake it is often easiest to use the rim canal to get close then take one of the many channels into the lake.

Environmental concerns

In 2007, during a drought, state water and wildlife managers removed thousands of truckloads of toxic mud from the lake's floor, in an effort to restore the lake's natural sandy base and create clearer water and better habitat for wildlife. The mud contained elevated levels of arsenic and other pesticides. According to tests from the South Florida Water Management District, arsenic levels on the northern part of the lake bed were as much as four times the limit for residential land. Independent tests found the mud too polluted for use on agricultural or commercial lands, and therefore difficult to dispose of on land.

Through early 2008, the lake remained well below normal levels, with large portions of the lake bed exposed above the water line. During this time, portions of the lake bed, covered in organic matter, dried out and caught fire. In late August 2008, Tropical Storm Fay inundated Florida with record amounts of rain. Lake Okeechobee received almost a  increase in water level, including local run-off from the tributaries.

In 2013, heavy rains in central Florida resulted in high runoff into the lake; rising lake levels forced the CoE (Army Corps of Engineers) to release large volumes of polluted water from the lake through the St. Lucie River estuary to the east and the Caloosahatchee River estuary to the west. Thus the normal mix of fresh and salt water in those estuaries was replaced by a flood of polluted fresh water resulting in ecological damage.

Since 2013, the CoE has been forced to pump billions of gallons of water out of the lake to avoid jeopardizing the integrity of the Hoover dike holding back the water from inundating the surrounding populated area. Some claim that sugar plantations have been pumping polluted water from their flooded fields into the lake, but U.S. Sugar claims back pumping is only to avoid flooding of communities, never to protect farmland. In March 2015, the rate was  daily. This results in pollution problems for the Treasure Coast, St. Lucie estuary, and the Indian River Lagoon.

In May 2016,  of the southern portion of the lake were affected by an algal bloom. The outbreak was possibly due in part to nutrient-laden waters reaching the lake from farms and other sources. Microcystin was found among the other species involved in the outbreak.

In July 2016, the Federal Government denied Governor Rick Scott's request for Federal Disaster Aid to the Treasure Coast as a result of the toxic algal bloom in the St. Lucie Estuary which was responsible for millions of dollars of lost income for local businesses: this reaffirmed the Federal Emergency Management Agency (FEMA) finding that the lake's water quality was a State issue. The Florida Department of Environmental Protection and Martin County had carried out toxicity testing on the algae, but had not funded any work to clean up the water, and a FEMA spokesman said that "The state has robust capability to respond to emergencies and disasters."

On June 23, 2017, the South Florida Water Management District was granted emergency permission to back pump clean water into Lake Okeechobee to save animals and plants in bloated water conservation areas."

Geology
Lake Okeechobee sits in a shallow geological trough that also underlies the Kissimmee River Valley and the Everglades. The trough is underlain by clay deposits that compacted more than the limestone and sand deposits did along both coasts of peninsular Florida. Until about 6,000 years ago, the trough was dry land. As the sea level rose, the water table in Florida also rose and rainfall increased. From 6,000 to 4,000 years ago, wetlands formed building up peat deposits. Eventually the water flow into the area created a lake, drowning the wetlands. At its capacity, the lake holds  of water and is the headwaters of the Everglades.

Its water is somewhat murky from runoff from surrounding farmlands. Water flows into Lake Okeechobee from several sources, including the Kissimmee River, Fisheating Creek, Lake Istokpoga, Taylor Creek, and smaller sources such as Nubbin Slough and Nicodemus Slough. The Kissimmee River is the largest source, providing more than 60% of the water flowing into Lake Okeechobee. Fisheating Creek is the second largest source for the lake, with about 9% of the total inflow. Prior to the 20th century, Lake Istokpoga was connected to the Kissimmee River by Istokpoga Creek, but during the rainy season Lake Istokpoga overflowed, with the water flowing in a 40 km wide sheet across the Indian Prairie into Lake Okeechobee. Today Lake Istokpoga drains into Lake Okeechobee through several canals that drain the Indian Prairie, and into the Kissimmee River through a canal that has replaced Istokpoga Creek. Historically, outflow from the lake was by sheet flow over the Everglades, but most of the outflow has been diverted to dredged canals connecting to coastal rivers, such as the Miami Canal to the Miami River, the New River on the east, and the Caloosahatchee River (via the Caloosahatchee Canal and Lake Hicpochee) on the southwest.

Uses

Congressionally authorized uses for Lake Okeechobee

According to the U.S. Army Corps of Engineers, the congressionally authorized uses for Lake Okeechobee include the following:
 Flood and storm risk management
 Navigation
 Water supply for the following:
Salinity control in estuaries
Regional groundwater control
Agricultural irrigation
Municipalities and industry
 Enhancement of fish and wildlife
 Recreation

Florida National Scenic Trail
There is a well-maintained paved pathway along the majority of the perimeter, although with significant breaks. It is used by hikers and bicyclists, and is wide enough to accommodate vehicles.

Fishing
The most common fish in this lake are largemouth bass, crappie, and bluegill. Pickerel have been less commonly caught.

Limnology 
This shallow lake has been previously studied for its algal blooms. Lake Okeechobee is known for its algal blooms in consequence of increased eutrophication. Algal blooms like this can be harmful to the environment, including the lake's flora and fauna, because of released toxins. The vegetation at Lake Okeechobee is important in maintaining the oxygen in the lake, of which many aquatic biota are reliant on. There are various species of biota in Lake Okeechobee that are interdependent on each other for food, habitat, and other resources. Multiple limnological studies and related research has been conducted at Lake Okeechobee.

Characteristics 
The lake is normally mixed, but on days with direct sunlight and limited wind, the lake can exhibit diurnal thermal stratification. Although daily thermal stratification is brief, a hypolimnion can form during this time resulting in decreased amounts of dissolved oxygen at the lake bottom. Lake transparency, measured as secchi depth, is found to be inversely correlated with the amount of suspended solids in the lake. Suspended solids varied with season with higher amounts of suspended solids in the winter, and thus less transparency on average, and lower amounts of suspended solids in the summer, leading to more transparency on average. Secchi depths not only varied across seasons, but also by location in the lake. Secchi depths of  have been recorded, indicating higher transparencies than average for the lake.

Fauna 
Lake Okeechobee is home to more than 40 species of native fish, along with introduced species, such as the Mayan cichlid, Cichlasoma urophthalmus. Fish species displaying varying distributions throughout the lake depending on seasonality, site depth, sediments, and turbidity. Yearly fish recruitment was found to be positively correlated with increased water levels, providing more substrate and protection. These fish populations support different wading birds, including various species of egrets, ibises, wood storks, and herons, along with alligator populations. Fish diets in Lake Okeechobee depend on macro-invertebrates and zooplankton, such as calanoids, cyclopoids, and cladoceran. Lake Okeechobee supports over 3,800 different arthropods, including insects and arachnids, along with around 400 species of nematodes.

Flora 
Vascular macrophytes are important in the nutrient dynamics of lakes, along with creating micro-habitats for fish and invertebrates, and providing substrate for epiphytes. Macrophytes provide the lake with oxygen through photosynthesis, along with acting as a buffer for eutrophication by uptake of phosphorus. However, with increased eutrophication of lakes along with climate change, trends are showing decreased richness of macrophytes. Because the fauna are so reliant on the macrophytes for habitat, food, and protection from predation, a decrease in macrophyte diversity and abundance has negative consequences on fauna richness. Macrophyte abundance is dependent on many abiotic factors such as water depth, water transparency and light availability, and nutrients, along with influence of biotic factors. Increasing phytoplankton and algal blooms from eutrophication and nutrient abundance can decrease water transparency and light availability to submerged macrophytes, providing one explanation how macrophytes are sensitive to eutrophication. Some submerged macrophytes that have been recorded at Lake Okeechobee include southern naiad (Najas guadelupensis), Illinois pondweed (Potamogeton illlinoensis), vallisneria (Vallisneria americana), and hydrilla (Hydrilla verticillata). Lake Okeechobee is afflicted with the invasive terrestrial plant, torpedograss (Panicum repens).

Eutrophication and Algal Blooms 
The concerning levels of total phosphorus (TP) began to be noticed in 1970s, and since then inputs of TP have averaged 516 tons per year. These yearly inputs can vary based on the volume of runoff entering the lake. The years 2005 and 2018 had particularly large volumes of water and TP inputs in relation to hurricanes increasing runoff. Despite limiting TP inputs by decreasing phosphorus use in agriculture, Lake Okeechobee has yet to be reach the aimed target set by the South Florida Water Management District's in the 1980s of reducing the lake's TP by 40 μg/L. Although proposed by the South Florida Water Management District, this initiative of limiting the lake's TP to 40 μg/L was adopted by The Lake Okeechobee Technical Advisory Committee (LOTAC), the United States Environmental Protection Agency (USEPA), and the Florida Department of Environmental Protection (FDEP), but phosphorus inputs have yet to be controlled enough to reach this goal. Concerning estimates of phosphorus assimilation capacity indicates that even if phosphorus inputs were to be stopped, or severely limited, the extensive saturation of the lake would result in it taking years before improved water quality can be observed.

These inputs of phosphorus provide optimal conditions for harmful algal blooms (HABs). Cyanobacteria (CyanoHABs), which need nitrogen and phosphorus for growth, have the ability to fix atmospheric nitrogen. With this ability along with the high inputs of phosphorus, the shallow nature of the lake providing plenty of sunlight, and cyanobacteria's preference for warm waters, Lake Okeechobee is an optimal environment for a cyanobacteria algal bloom. The presence of various species of cyanobacteria in Lake Okeechobee have been recorded since the 1980s. Cyanobacteria produce various toxins, including microcystin, which is not only harmful to the environment, but humans. In 2016, Lake Okeechobee experienced an extensive cyanobacteria algal bloom that lasted from May to mid-July. During the previous 2015–16 winter, there were relatively high recorded temperatures, and higher than average rates of precipitation and storms in relation to the El Niño event. As mentioned, higher rates of precipitation can lead to greater influxes of runoff which unload more phosphorus into the lake, enabling harmful algal bloom. Along with this algal bloom in 2016, other algal blooms have been found to occur in relation to hurricanes and other climate events leading to increased water flow into the lake.

Research at Lake Okeechobee 
Research done by James et al. (2009) aimed to evaluate and compare shallow lakes, including Lake Okeechobee and Lake Taihu in P.R. China, including their light, temperature, and nutrient dynamics. This research provides important knowledge on conditions that influence algal blooms. They found that for both lakes, wind, nutrients, water depth, and water transparency varied seasonally, and this had implications on phytoplankton abundance. Different locations in the lake may have had different limiting factors based on the light and nutrient availability in those locations. At Lake Okeechobee specifically, algal blooms were found to have strong effects during the winter on the western side of the lake.

In the limnological study conducted by Beaver et al. (2013) at Lake Okeechobee, lake phytoplankton composition was examined in response to conditions of anthropogenic inputs, including nutrient inputs, along with natural events, like extreme weather conditions. Lake Okeechobee was a great location for this study because of its long history of agricultural runoff causing algal blooms, along with its location in the Gulf of Mexico making it susceptible to weather events like tropical storms and hurricanes. From 2000–2008, phytoplankton samples were collected using an integrated tube sampler, and weather conditions, including temperature and wind conditions, were recorded. They found that phytoplankton composition transitioned from non-nitrogen fixing cyanobacteria dominating the lake before 2000, to nitrogen fixing cyanobacteria dominating the lake after 2000 and up until 2004 as phosphorus inputs were high and nitrogen was limiting. This time was referred to as the "pre-hurricane" time period, and the period after the 2004–2005 hurricane season was referred to as the "post-hurricane" period. During the post-hurricane period, light became limiting and influenced phytoplankton composition.

Kramer et al. (2018) studied Lake Okeechobee during and after its major 2016 algal bloom that was related to the El Niño event. They collected information on nutrient availability, phytoplankton communities, and the presence of toxins, along with the genetic makeup of the phytoplankton communities and their genetic abilities to produce toxins. Additionally, they conducted nutrient experiments to couple with their findings. They found that cyanobacteria with the ability to do nitrogen fixation were in high abundance during this 2016 algal bloom. During this time, nitrogen was a limiting factor due to the extreme amounts of phosphorus in the freshwater ecosystem. The field experiments conducted with this study found that microcystin, the toxin produced by cyanobacteria, was produced in higher quantities when there was more nitrogen present.

A study conducted by Pei, Zhang, and Mitsch (2020) examined nitrate concentrations, and their respective isotope compositions, in hopes of determining origins of major inflows and outflows of nitrogen into the lake and what their respective contributions are. They found that ammonium based fertilizers and soil nitrogen were the largest contributors to nitrate found in the lake. Manure and precipitation were two other sources of nitrate. These results can aid in monitoring and regulation of nitrogen uses around Okeechobee, and subsequently aid in restoring the lake.

Notes

References

External links

 
Okeechobee
Everglades
Okeechobee
Okeechobee
Okeechobee
Okeechobee
Okeechobee
Quadripoints and higher